Louis Guy Marie Jean de Lubersac (1878-1932) was a French aristocrat, landowner and politician. He served as a member of French Senate from 1920 to 1932, representing Aisne.

Early life
Guy de Lubersac was born on 20 January 1878 in Paris, France. He studied the Law and graduated from Sciences Po.

Career
De Lubersac inherited the marquisate of Lubersac, including land in Aisne. He became a member of the Jockey-Club de Paris. He was elected as the mayor of Faverolles in 1904. He served in the French Army during World War I.

De Lubersac served as a member of French Senate from 1920 to 1932, representing Aisne.

Death
De Lubersac died on 15 April 1932 in Paris, France.

References

1878 births
1932 deaths
Politicians from Paris
Sciences Po alumni
French military personnel of World War I
French Senators of the Third Republic
Marquesses
Senators of Aisne